The 1892 North Carolina Tar Heels football team represented the University of North Carolina in the 1892 college football season.  They played six games with a final record of 5–1. The team captain for the 1892 season was Michael Hoke. The team claims a southern title even though it was defeated by Virginia, for it beat the Cavaliers in a rematch. Those games with UVA mark the beginning of the South's Oldest Rivalry.

Schedule

Players

Varsity lettermen

Line

Backfield

Substitutes

Unlisted
William Pinckney

References

North Carolina
North Carolina Tar Heels football seasons
North Carolina Tar Heels football